Vicci Martinez (born September 21, 1984) is an American singer/songwriter and actress from Tacoma, Washington. She came in joint third on NBC's singing competition series The Voice in 2011.  She released her 2012 album with Republic Records (Universal Music Group), but self-released her 2015 album.

Biography and career

Martinez, the daughter of a Mexican father employed as a plumber, and a mother employed as an ESL teacher, graduated from Stadium High School in Tacoma, Washington. She first took the stage at the age of 16. Firmly grounded in the tradition of acoustic-rock, Vicci Martinez writes and performs music that is personal and often autobiographical. She has received critical acclaim for her live performances.

After the 2005 release of her album, On My Way, Martinez went on tour and released a full-length concert DVD and documentary in 2006 titled Vicci Martinez Live. The DVD, produced by Joel Veatch and Flying Spot, received positive press attention. Vicci also released a live CD that had been recorded at Jazzbones, a musical venue in Tacoma, Washington.

Martinez won the regional tryouts for the first season of American Idol, but declined her invitation to the second round on the grounds that, in her opinion, the contract was too restrictive.  She later appeared on CBS's 2003 season of Star Search.

In 2011, Martinez competed on the U.S. talent show The Voice.  Billboard magazine praised her diverse performance abilities saying "she gives every song a mature delivery and she appears comfortable in whatever skin she has chosen to adopt on a given night. With a drum corps alongside her and a backstory about her late father to warm the heart, she tore through Florence and the Machine's Dog Days Are Over with alacrity; the closing performance Tuesday was also the night's best performance."  Martinez came in first place on judge CeeLo Green's team and represented him in the final round. She finished third overall.

Performances on The Voice 

According to her Voice coach, CeeLo Green, after her appearance on the show in 2011, Martinez signed a record deal. Her EP, Come Along, was released on May 1, 2012, followed by her Universal Republic album "Vicci" on June 19 of the same year.

Her 2012 chart hit, "Come Along", a cover of a 2001 single from Swedish recording act Titiyo, featured Cee Lo Green. Though the song was a top 20 hit throughout Central Europe, it was not released in the U.S. or U.K.

On May 1, 2015, Martinez self-released her album, I Am Vicci Martinez.

In 2018, after being discovered by the casting director via a google search, Martinez played inmate Daddy on season 6 of the Netflix series Orange Is the New Black. Martinez also appeared in the seventh and final season.

Personal life
Martinez identifies as lesbian. In July 2018, it was confirmed that she is in a relationship with her Orange Is the New Black co-star Emily Tarver.

Discography

Albums
 2000: VMB
 2003: Sleep to Dream
 2005: On My Way
 2006: Vicci Martinez Live
 2007: I Could Be a Boxer
 2009: From the Outside In
 2010: I Love You in the Morning
 2011: Live From Jazzbones
 2012: Vicci (Universal Republic)
 2015: I Am Vicci

EPs
 2012: Come Along (Universal Republic)
 2015: I Am

Singles

Filmography

Television

Television

References

External links
 

1984 births
Living people
20th-century American women singers
21st-century American women singers
American actresses of Mexican descent
American child singers
American women pop singers
American women rock singers
American women singer-songwriters
American rock musicians
American rock songwriters
American lesbian actresses
American lesbian musicians
LGBT Hispanic and Latino American people
LGBT people from Washington (state)
American LGBT singers
American LGBT songwriters
Musicians from Tacoma, Washington
Singers from Tacoma, Washington
Singer-songwriters from Washington (state)
The Voice (franchise) contestants
Lesbian singers
Lesbian songwriters
20th-century LGBT people
21st-century LGBT people